Father Taylor may refer to:

 male parent named Taylor (surname) or Taylor (given name)

 male clergyman of various religious groups
a particular male clergyman in priest's orders (either secular or "religious") having the surname Taylor; in Anglican churches usually only those who are High churchmen
 Charles Taylor (priest) (1953-)
 Edward Thompson Taylor (1793-1871)
 Henry Gordon Taylor (1908–1987)
 Hugh Taylor (priest) (-1585)
 Isaac Taylor (priest) (1829-1901)
 James Ignatius Taylor (1805-1875)
 Paul Taylor (priest) (1953-)
 Robert Taylor (Archdeacon of Lewes)
 Robert Taylor (Provost of Cumbrae)
 Stephen Taylor (priest) (1955-)
 William Taylor (Dean of Portsmouth) (1956-)
 William Taylor (Lollard) (-1423)
 John Taylor (Master of the Rolls) (1480-1534)